The Ukrainian Catholic Eparchy of Santa María del Patrocinio en Buenos Aires  is an eparchy (diocese, bishopric) of the Ukrainian Greek Catholic Church, which uses the Byzantine Rite in the Ukrainian language, for its faithful in major immigration country Argentina.
 
Its cathedral see is in the capital city of Buenos Aires, but must not be confused with the Roman Catholic (Latin rite) Metropolitan see of the Ecclesiastical province of Buenos Aires in Argentina.

History 
 February 19, 1959: Ordinariate for Eastern Catholics in Argentina Established
 February 9, 1968: Established as the Ukrainian Catholic Apostolic Exarchate of Argentina
 April 24, 1978: Promoted as Eparchy of Santa María del Patrocinio en Buenos Aires

Episcopate 
Apostolic Exarchs of Argentina (Ukrainian Rite) 
 Bishop Andrés Sapelak, S.D.B. (February 9, 1968 – April 24, 1978)
Bishops of Santa María del Patrocinio en Buenos Aires (Ukrainian Rite)
 Bishop Andrés Sapelak, S.D.B. (April 24, 1978 – December 12, 1997)
 Bishop Miguel Mykycej, F.D.P. (Apostolic Administrator January 21, 1998 – April 24, 1999)
 Bishop Miguel Mykycej, F.D.P. (April 24, 1999 – April 10, 2010)
Apostolic Administrator of Santa María del Patrocinio en Buenos Aires (Ukrainian Rite)
Sviatoslav Shevchuk,  (April 10, 2010 – March 25, 2011)
Apostolic Administrator sede vacante of Santa María del Patrocinio en Buenos Aires 
Bishop Daniel Kozelinski Netto (June 22, 2011 – October 8, 2016)
Bishop Daniel Kozelinski Netto (since October 8, 2016)

Auxiliary bishops
Miguel Mykycej, F.D.P. (1990-1999), appointed Bishop here
Sviatoslav Shevchuk (2009-2011), appointed Major Archbishop of Kyiv-Halyč {Kiev} (Ukrainian), Ukraine

References and external links 
 GCatholic.org
 Catholic Hierarchy

Christianity in Buenos Aires
European-Argentine culture in Buenos Aires
Ukrainian diaspora in Argentina
Buenos Aires
Christian organizations established in 1968
Eastern Catholic dioceses in Argentina